James Light (christened 7 August 1803) was an English cricketer who played for Sussex. He was born in Midhurst.

Light made a single first-class appearance, in 1825, against Hampshire. Batting in the opening order, Light scored 8 runs in the first innings in which he batted and 1 run in the second.

See also
 Light (surname)

External links
James Light at Cricket Archive 

1803 births
English cricketers
Sussex cricketers
People from Midhurst
Year of death missing
English cricketers of 1787 to 1825